Blaze of Noon is a 1947 aviation adventure film directed by John Farrow and based on writer and aviator Ernest K. Gann's best-selling novel Blaze of Noon (1946), a story about early air mail operations. The screenplay was from well-known writer and aviator Frank "Spig" Wead and Arthur Sheekman and starred Anne Baxter, William Holden, Sonny Tufts and William Bendix.

Plot
Early in the 1920s, the four McDonald brothers are performing in a carnival as a stunt flying team, when they are hired by Mercury Airlines in Newark, New Jersey, to fly the national air mail for the US Air Mail Service.

One of the brothers, Colin (William Holden), instantly falls in love with Lucille Stewart (Anne Baxter), the nurse giving him a physical. After less than a day, he proposes and she accepts. They marry and Colin starts flying for the company along the east coast. Lucille soon becomes irritated by the brothers' extreme dedication to their work, but Colin promises that his efforts will make it possible for them to buy a home.

When the youngest McDonald, Keith (Johnny Sands), crashes his aircraft and dies, Ronald (Sonny Tufts) feels guilty over causing his brother's death, since he was the one who taught him to fly. He quits flying and becomes a car salesman instead. When their friend and colleague "Porkie" (William Bendix) is fired for flying recklessly over a passenger train, he also becomes a car salesman.

The next brother to crash is Tad (Sterling Hayden). Even though he survives, he is unable to fly again.

Colin's former girlfriend, Poppy (Jean Wallace), pays him a visit and tries to win him back, but he stays true to Lucille. Soon afterwards, their first child, a son, is born. Colin has promised to stop flying once he becomes a father, but when he is offered a raise by the company, he still continues to fly. During his first passenger flight, the wings ice over, and Colin crashes and dies. Colin's boss and Tad are the ones who have to break the news to Lucille, who is hosting their housewarming party. She decides to name her son Keith.

Cast
 Anne Baxter as Lucille Stewart
 William Holden as Colin McDonald
 Sonny Tufts as Ronald McDonald
 William Bendix as "Porkie"
 Sterling Hayden as Tad McDonald
 Howard Da Silva as Gafferty
 Johnny Sands as Keith McDonald
 Jean Wallace as Poppy
 Edith King as Mrs. Murphy
 Lloyd Corrigan as Reverend Polly
 Dick Hogan as Sydney
 Will Wright as Mr. Thomas
 Lester Dorr as Sam

Production

In pre-production, director John Farrow gathered research by flying on American Airlines' cargo flights. Principal photography for Blaze of Noon took place at both Paramount Studios and the Paramount Ranch, beginning on November 1, 1946, and ending in early January 1947.

Noted Hollywood movie pilot Paul Mantz flew a Pitcairn Mailwing in the film; he also served as the aerial coordinator. The film was able to gain national and international notoriety when Mantz flew his war-surplus North American P-51C Mustang fighter that he named "Blaze of Noon" to a first-place finish in the 1946 Bendix Trophy cross-country air race.

Reception
Although Blaze of Noon could have been dismissed as out-of-date and more 1930s than 1940s fare, Bosley Crowther noted in his favourable review in The New York Times, "... youthful filmgoers who were mere babes in Lindbergh's salad days (and we were talking to a youngster recently who didn't even know who Lindbergh was) will probably find this aerial romance an agreeably entertaining thing."

See also
 Sterling Hayden filmography

References

Notes

Citations

Bibliography

 Dwiggins, Don. Hollywood Pilot: The Biography of Paul Mantz. Garden City, New York: Doubleday & Company, Inc., 1967. 
 Schiller, Gerald A. "Hollywood's Daredevil Pilot." Aviation History, Vol. 13, no. 6, July 2003.

External links
 
 
 

1947 films
1940s adventure drama films
American adventure drama films
American aviation films
American black-and-white films
Films scored by Adolph Deutsch
Films based on American novels
Films directed by John Farrow
Films set in the 1920s
Paramount Pictures films
1947 drama films
1940s English-language films
1940s American films